Blake Aaron is a guitarist and film music composer, based in Los Angeles.

Discography
 With Every Touch (2002)
 Bringin' It Back (2003)
 Desire (2007)
 Soul Stories (2015)
 Color and Passion (2020)

References

External links
 Blake Aaron's website
 Blake's radio show website
 
 
 
 
 

20th-century births
Living people
American jazz guitarists
Smooth jazz guitarists
Guitarists from California
Place of birth missing (living people)
21st-century American guitarists
American session musicians
American male guitarists
20th-century American guitarists
Jazz musicians from California
20th-century American male musicians
21st-century American male musicians
American male jazz musicians
Year of birth missing (living people)